Arne was a town of ancient Boeotia, mentioned by Homer, and probably founded by the Boeotians after their expulsion from ancient Thessaly. Pausanias identified this Boeotian Arne with Chaeroneia, Strabo with Acraephium; and others again supposed that it had been swallowed up by the waters of the Lake Copais. Modern scholars locate Arne with the site of archaeological site of Magoula Balomenou. It may be linked to the ancient citadel of Gla.

References

Populated places in ancient Boeotia
Former populated places in Greece
Ancient Greek archaeological sites in Central Greece
Locations in the Iliad